Robert King, 1st Baron Kingsborough (18 February 1724 – 22 May 1755), known as Sir Robert King, Bt, between 1740 and 1748, was an Irish landowner and politician.

King was the elder son of Sir Henry King, 3rd Baronet, by Isabella Wingfield, daughter of Edward Wingfield and sister of Richard Wingfield, 1st Viscount Powerscourt. He succeeded his father in the baronetcy in 1740. In 1744 he was returned to the Irish Parliament for Boyle, a seat he held until 1748, when, aged only 24, he was raised to the Irish peerage as Baron Kingsborough. He was also Custos Rotulorum of Roscommon.

Lord Kingsborough died in May 1755, aged 31. He never married and the barony died with him. He was succeeded in the baronetcy by his younger brother, Edward, who was created Earl of Kingston in 1768.

References

|-

1724 births
1755 deaths
Barons in the Peerage of Ireland
Peers of Ireland created by George II
King
Robert
Members of the Parliament of Ireland (pre-1801) for County Roscommon constituencies